The Leader of the Opposition in Germany is the parliamentary leader of the largest political party in the Bundestag that is not in government.

In Germany, the Leader of the Opposition is an informal title that is not even mentioned and does not have any formal functions in the by-laws of the Bundestag. However, the Leader of the Opposition is, by convention, the first person to respond to the most senior government spokesperson during a debate. The title also exists on a state level, but only in the Landtag of Schleswig-Holstein is the position formally recognized as an actual office.

Only two Leaders of the Opposition went on to be directly elected Chancellor afterwards: Helmut Kohl (1976–1982) and Angela Merkel (2002–2005).

List of opposition leaders in Germany since 1949 (Federal Republic of Germany)

References

Germany